Swallownest Miners Welfare F.C. was an English football club located in Swallownest, Sheffield, South Yorkshire.

History
The club competed in the Yorkshire Football League in the 1960s, competing in Division 1 on three occasions. They also played in the FA Amateur Cup and the FA Vase.

League and cup history

Honours

League
'''Yorkshire League Division 2
Promoted: 1961–62, 1968–69

Cup
None

Records
Best League performance: 8th, Yorkshire League Division 1, 1962–63
Best FA Amateur Cup performance: 4th Qualifying Round, 1961–62
Best FA Vase performance: 1st Round, 1974–75

References

Defunct football clubs in South Yorkshire
Defunct football clubs in England
Yorkshire Football League
Sheffield Association League
Mining association football teams in England